The Winans are an American gospel quartet from Detroit, Michigan consisting of brothers Marvin, Carvin, Michael and Ronald Winans.

Members
Please refer to the Winans family page for more detail on the individual members.

About: Origins & Music

Origins
Brothers Ronald, Marvin, Carvin, and Michael Winans (the second, third, fourth and fifth siblings of the Winans family) grew up in Detroit, Michigan and were discovered by Andrae Crouch, who signed them to Light Records.

Music
Brothers Ronald, Marvin, and Carvin made two albums in 1974 (without Michael) and 1975 (with Michael) under the name "The Testimonial Singers", one album which they would re-record two songs for later albums (Fallow Ground and J.E.S.U.S) before getting their big break with their first record as "The Winans" with Introducing The Winans was produced in 1981 by Andrae Crouch, two years after he discovered them and invited them to tour with him. They performed vocals in This Is America, Charlie Brown'''s segment "The Building of the Transcontinental Railroad" in 1989. Their style was noted for its crossover efforts and received airplay on R&B radio. The group's last recording was in 1995, but they have subsequently been involved in various Winans family projects where they are credited as "The Winans" (e.g. November 2000's Christmas: Our Gifts To You).

Eldest brother of the group Ronald Winans died on June 17th, 2005 of retaining fluid.

Discography

Studio albums

Compilation

Singles

Awards
 Grammy Award for Best Contemporary Soul Gospel Album: All Out (1993)
 Grammy Award for Best Soul Gospel Performance By A Duo, Group, Choir Or Chorus: "Let Brotherly Love Continue" (Daniel Winans featuring The Winans & BeBe Winans) (1990)
 Grammy Award for Best Gospel Performance By A Duo Or Group, Choir Or Chorus: The Winans Live At Carnegie Hall'' (1988)
 Grammy Award for Best Soul Gospel Performance By A Duo, Group, Choir Or Chorus: "Ain't No Need To Worry" (The Winans featuring Anita Baker) (1987)
 Grammy Award for Best Soul Gospel Performance By A Duo, Group, Choir Or Chorus: "Let My People Go" (1986)
 Grammy Award for Best Soul Gospel Performance, Male: "Bring Back The Days Of Yea And Nay" (Marvin Winans) (1985)
 Grammy Award for Best Soul Gospel Performance By A Duo, Group, Choir Or Chorus: "Tomorrow" (1985)

See also
Winans family
Ronald Winans
Marvin Winans

References

External links

American families
American gospel musical groups
Family musical groups
Grammy Award winners
Singers from Detroit
American gospel singers
Qwest Records artists
Musical groups established in 1980
African-American musical groups
1980 establishments in Michigan